The Paußnitz is a river of Saxony, Germany. It is a branch of the White Elster near Leipzig.

See also
List of rivers of Saxony

Rivers of Saxony
0Paussnitz
Rivers of Germany